Irena Hausmanowa-Petrusewicz, née Ginzburg (December 27, 1917 – July 7, 2015) was  Polish doctor and neurologist who specialized in neuromuscular diseases.

She was a pioneer of myology and a founder of  myology and electromyography in Poland.

She was born in Warsaw to a family which came from Lwow. 

Her father was a literary critic and her mother was a  dermatologist.

Awards
Commander's Cross  with Star of the Order of Polonia Restituta on the 50th anniversary of the Polish Academy of Sciences (2002)
Commander's Cross of the Order of Polonia Restituta (1986)
Officer's Cross of the Order of Polonia Restituta (July 22, 1951, for outstanding scientific activity in the field of medicine )
Silver Cross of Merit
Medal of the National Education Commission (1985)

References

1917 births
2015 deaths
University of Lviv alumni
Polish neurologists
Burials at Powązki Military Cemetery
Members of the Polish Academy of Sciences